The Champagne Murders is a 1967 French suspense thriller mystery film based on a story William Benjamin, directed by Claude Chabrol and starring Anthony Perkins. It was the first of two films that Chabrol made with Perkins, who is most famous for his role in Psycho, directed by Alfred Hitchcock, whom Chabrol admires above all other directors.

For his role in the film, Maurice Ronet won the Best Actor award at the San Sebastián International Film Festival.

Plot
Taking a prostitute to a park after drinking, Paul Wagner is attacked by unknown assailants, who leave him with a serious head injury and strangle her. Unable to  manage the family champagne business, it is run for him by Christine Belling and her assistant Jacqueline. Christine tries to take advantage of Paul by selling the company, but he refuses to sign. On a business trip to Hamburg with Christine's husband Christopher (Perkins), he gets drunk and goes to a park with a prostitute, who is found strangled in the morning. Going with Christopher to the party of a promiscuous artist, Paul again gets drunk and she is found strangled in the morning.

Terrified that he may be murdering young women after drinking, Paul seeks the help of Christine while Christopher is away. She takes advantage of Paul by getting him to sign away  his rights in the company. He goes home despondent and in the morning Christine is found strangled. Christopher, who now owns the business, turns up with a striking blonde, whom Paul remembers seeing in Hamburg and at the artist's party. It is Jacqueline, without the dark wig and pale make-up she wore to work, who is Christopher's mistress and has done the last three stranglings. A gun is pulled out and the movie camera recedes as the three fight over the gun.

Cast
Anthony Perkins as Christopher
Maurice Ronet as Paul
Yvonne Furneaux as Christine
Stéphane Audran as Jacqueline
Annie Vidal as Blonde
Henry Jones as Mr. Clarke
Catherine Sola as Denise
George Skaff as Mr. Pfeiffer
Christa Lang as Paula
Marie-Ange Aniès as Michele
Suzanne Lloyd as Evelyn

Production
The Champagne Murders was Chabrol's first film with English-speaking actors. He filmed each scene in both English and French; much of the English dialogue was mouthed phonetically by the French actors and later dubbed in English.

The film was shot in Techniscope format.

Reception
In a New York Times review, critic Vincent Canby wrote: "Mr. Chabrol ... has made a film that has the shape and structure of a murder mystery, but which is, essentially, a funny, sardonic social drama."

Release
The film was not released on VHS in the U.S. In February 2018, Umbrella Entertainment released a French-language DVD which contains the 105-minute version. In July 2019, Kino Lorber released both the DVD and Blu-ray versions in the United States and Canada. The Blu-ray version, contains the 98-minute English-language version rather than the 105-minute French-language version, and came with the DTS-HD 2.0 Master Audio and Trailers from Hell featurette.

References

External links

1967 films
1960s thriller films
Films about amnesia
Films directed by Claude Chabrol
French thriller films
Films with screenplays by Paul Gégauff
1960s French-language films
1960s French films